The 2017–18 SC Fortuna Köln season was the 70th season in the football club's history. The season covers a period from 1 July 2017 to 30 June 2018.

Players

Squad information

Friendly matches

Competitions

3. Liga

League table

Results summary

Results by round

Matches

Middle Rhine Cup

References

SC Fortuna Köln seasons
Koln, Fortuna